Hyman Wright (also known as Papa Life) is a record producer and audio engineer from Kingston, Jamaica, who has produced more than 150 reggae singles, mostly through his Brooklyn-based record label, Jah Life, which he founded in the late 1970s.

In 1981, Wright produced one of Eek-A-Mouse's first singles, "Georgie Porgie". After Wright and Barrington Levy met in 1979, he produced a number of Levy's early releases. Among these are "Black Roses" (1983) and "Murderer" (1984); the latter Wright co-produced with long-time collaborator Patrick Chin.

See also
 List of people from Kingston, Jamaica

References

External links
 Hyman Wright in the Jamaican Riddim Directory
 Hyman Wright at ReggaeID
 Hyman Wright at Riddimguide.com
 Hyman Wright at Roots Archives

Year of birth missing (living people)
Living people
Jamaican dancehall musicians
Jamaican businesspeople
Jamaican record producers
Jamaican reggae musicians
Musicians from Kingston, Jamaica